Edgar Charles Jones (December 29, 1903 – October 27, 1980) was an American football and basketball player, college athletic director and banker.  He played both sports at the University of Florida in the 1920s and set a Florida Gators football single-season scoring record (108 points) that stood for 44 years.  He was the university's athletic director from 1930 to 1936.  He later served as executive vice president of Miami Federal Savings and Loan.

Early years

Jones was a Florida native who graduated from Jacksonville High School in 1922.  While in high school, he was a member of the school's football, basketball, baseball and track teams. A little known fact the 1921 season of Duval High School they were not only won the Florida State High School Championship but were ranked  as the number 1 National High School Champion Football team for 1921 season! He received varsity letters in football all four years and was an all-state player in his senior year.  He lettered in basketball during his junior and senior years and was an all-state player as a senior.  As a senior, he was also Jacksonville's individual point leader in track.

University of Florida

After graduating from high school, Jones enrolled at the University of Florida in Gainesville.  He played at the halfback position for coach James Van Fleet and coach Tom Sebring's Florida Gators football teams from 1923 to 1925.  In his first season on the freshman team, the team won the southern crown for freshmen squads.  Memorably, he scored all of the Gators' points in a 16 to 6, second-half comeback victory in the rain over the Alabama Crimson Tide in 1923. The scores came on runs of 10 yards around right end, a 12-yard place kick, and a 20-yard run around right end.  During his three seasons on the Gators varsity, the team compiled a win–loss–tie record of 20–5–2, the best three-year stretch in team history.  As a senior in 1925, he was the captain of the Gators team that compiled an 8–2 record – the best record in the first twenty seasons of the Gators football team.  That year, Jones scored a total of 16 touchdowns – eight rushing, six receiving and two kick returns; his 108 points remained a Gators single-season record for 44 years. The single season scoring record was broken by Tommy Durrance (by 2 points in the final game of an 11 game season) where Jones record of 108 points occurred in only a 10 game season! Jones single season record from the 1925 season still remains in the top 5 of Florida players single season record for points scored.  After the conclusion of the 1925 season, he was invited to play in the inaugural East–West Shrine Game, the first Gator ever invited to a post-season all-star bowl game.

Jones also played for coach James White's Florida Gators men's basketball team in 1924 and 1925, and was twice selected as the team captain, after first serving as the team manager for two years.  He graduated from the University of Florida with a Bachelor of Laws degree (LL.B.) in 1926, and was later inducted into the University of Florida Athletic Hall of Fame as a "Gator Great."

Business and athletic administration career

After earning his law degree, Jones began practicing law in the law office of Giles Patterson.  From 1927 to 1930, Jones was employed by the Atlantic National Bank of Jacksonville as publicity director and statistician.

In June 1930, Jones became the University of Florida's athletic director, a position he held until May 1936.  While serving as athletic director, he agreed to reimburse bus fare for sports broadcaster Red Barber to give a 15-minute talks on WJAX before Florida football games.  Barber later wrote that his arrangement with Jones was the first "fee" he ever received for broadcasting on a commercial station.

In May 1936, Jones left the University of Florida to accept a position as executive vice president with Miami Federal Savings and Loan. In December 1941 (just after the Japanese attack on Pearl Harbor)Lt. Commander Edgar C. Jones USNR activated his United States Navy Reserves status and was assigned as Commander (Head of United States Naval Law Enforcement)of the United States Navy Shore Patrol unit at the Naval Base in Charleston, SC.  In 1948 Jones became General Manager of Claude Nolan Cadillac in Jacksonville, FL and then in June of 1951 was promoted to become Vice President and General Manager of the (Claude Nolan) Nolan Brown Cadillac dealership offices in Miami and Miami Beach.  He was also active in politics and was a supporter and Campaign Manager for Florida Governor Daniel T. McCarty, and served as a surrogate speaker for McCarty during his initial, unsuccessful campaign for governor in 1948.

See also 

 Florida Gators
 History of the University of Florida
 List of Levin College of Law graduates
 List of University of Florida faculty and administrators
 List of University of Florida Athletic Hall of Fame members

References 

 

1903 births
1980 deaths
American football drop kickers
American football halfbacks
American football quarterbacks
Florida Gators athletic directors
Florida Gators football players
Florida Gators men's basketball players
Florida Gators men's golf coaches
All-Southern college football players
Players of American football from Jacksonville, Florida
Basketball players from Florida
American men's basketball players
Fredric G. Levin College of Law alumni